Michael Joseph Mansfield (March 16, 1903 – October 5, 2001) was an American politician and diplomat. A Democrat, he served as a U.S. representative (1943–1953) and a U.S. senator (1953–1977) from Montana. He was the longest-serving Senate Majority Leader and served from 1961 to 1977. During his tenure, he shepherded Great Society programs through the Senate.

Born in Brooklyn, Mansfield grew up in Great Falls, Montana. He lied about his age to serve in the United States Navy during World War I. After the war, he became a professor of history and political science at the University of Montana. He won election to the House of Representatives and served on the House Committee on Foreign Affairs during World War II.

In 1952, he defeated incumbent Republican Senator Zales Ecton to take a seat in the Senate. Mansfield served as Senate Majority Whip from 1957 to 1961. Mansfield ascended to Senate Majority Leader after Lyndon B. Johnson resigned from the Senate to become vice president. In the later years of the campaign, he eventually opposed escalation of the Vietnam War and supported President Richard Nixon's plans to replace US soldiers from Southeast Asia with Vietnamese belligerents.

After retiring from the Senate, Mansfield served as US Ambassador to Japan from 1977 to 1988. Upon retiring as ambassador, he was awarded the nation's highest civilian honor, the Presidential Medal of Freedom. Mansfield is the longest-serving American ambassador to Japan in history. After his ambassadorship, Mansfield served for a time as a senior adviser on East Asian affairs to Goldman Sachs, the Wall Street investment banking firm.

Early childhood
Mansfield was born on March 1, 1903, in the Brooklyn borough of New York City. He was the son of Irish immigrants Patrick J. Mansfield and Josephine (née O'Brien) Mansfield. His father struggled to support the family, having to work several different jobs, ranging from a construction worker, hotel porter, and maintenance man. After Mansfield's mother died of pneumonia in 1906, his father sent Mansfield and his two sisters to live with his great-aunt and uncle in Great Falls, Montana. 

He attended local public schools, and worked in his relatives' grocery store. He turned into a habitual runaway, even living at a state orphanage in Twin Bridges for half a year.

Military service
At 14, Mansfield dropped out of school and lied about his age in order to enlist in the US Navy during World War I. He went on several overseas convoys on the  but was discharged by the Navy after his real age was discovered. (He was the last known veteran of the war to die before he reached the age of 100 and the last World War I veteran to sit in the US Senate.) After his Navy discharge, he enlisted in the US Army, serving as a private from 1919 to 1920.

Mansfield was a Private First Class in the US Marine Corps from 1920 to 1922. He served in the Western Recruiting Division at San Francisco until January 1921, when he was transferred to the Marine Barracks at Puget Sound, Washington. The following month, he was detached to the Guard Company, Marine Barracks, Navy Yard, Mare Island, California. In April, he boarded the USAT Sherman, bound for the Philippines. After a brief stopover at the Marine Barracks at Cavite, he arrived at his duty station on May 5, 1921, the Marine Barracks, Naval Station, Olongapo, Philippine Islands. One year later, Mansfield was assigned to Company A, Marine Battery, Asiatic Fleet. A short tour of duty with the Asiatic Fleet took him along the coast of China before he returned to Olongapo in late May 1922. His service with the Marines established a lifelong interest in Asia.

That August, Mansfield returned to Cavite in preparation for his return to the United States and eventual discharge. On November 9, 1922, Marine Private Michael J. Mansfield was released on the completion of his enlistment. He was awarded the Good Conduct Medal, his character being described as "excellent" during his two years as a Marine.

Education
Following his return to Montana in 1922, Mansfield worked as a "mucker" and shoveled ore and other waste in the copper mines of Butte for eight years. Having never attended high school, he took entrance examinations to attend the Montana School of Mines (1927–1928), studying to become a mining engineer. He later met a local schoolteacher and his future wife, Maureen Hayes, who encouraged him to further his education. With her financial support, Mansfield studied at the University of Montana in Missoula, where he took both high school and college courses. He was also a member of Alpha Tau Omega fraternity. He earned his Bachelor of Arts degree in 1933 and was offered a graduate assistantship teaching two courses at the university. He also worked part-time in the registrar's office. He earned a Master of Arts degree from the University of Montana in 1934 with the thesis "American Diplomatic Relations with Korea, 1866–1910." From 1934 to 1942, he taught classes in Far Eastern and Latin American history and also lectured some years on Greek and Roman history. He also attended the University of California, Los Angeles from 1936 to 1937.

US Representative

In 1940, Mansfield ran for the Democratic nomination for the House of Representatives in Montana's 1st congressional district but was defeated by Jerry J. O'Connell, a former holder of the seat, in the primary. The general election was won by Republican Jeannette Rankin, who had previously won what was formerly an at-large seat in the House in 1916 and served until her defeat in 1920. Mansfield decided to run for the seat again in the following election and won it by defeating the businessman Howard K. Hazelbaker after Rankin, who had voted against the entry of the United States into World War II, decided not to run for what would have been her third term.

Mansfield served five terms in the House, being re-elected in 1944, 1946, 1948, and 1950. His military service and academic experience landed him a seat on the House Foreign Affairs Committee. He went to China on a special mission for US President Franklin D. Roosevelt in 1944 and served as a delegate to the ninth Inter-American Conference in Colombia in 1948. In 1951, he was appointed by President Harry S. Truman as a delegate to the United Nations' sixth session in Paris. During his House tenure, he also expressed his support for price controls, a higher minimum wage, the Marshall Plan, and aid to Turkey and Greece. He opposed the House Un-American Activities Committee, the Taft–Hartley Act, and the Twenty-second Amendment.

US Senator
In 1952, Mansfield was elected to the Senate after he had narrowly defeated the Republican incumbent, Zales Ecton. He served as Senate Majority Whip under Majority Leader Lyndon B. Johnson from 1957 to 1961. In 1961, after Johnson resigned from the Senate to become Vice President, Mansfield was unanimously elected the Democratic floor leader and thus Senate Majority Leader. Serving sixteen years, from 1961 until his retirement in 1977, Mansfield is the longest-serving Majority Leader in the history of the Senate. The Washington Post compared Mansfield's behavior as Majority Leader to Johnson's by saying, "Instead of Johnson's browbeating tactics, Mansfield led by setting an example of humility and accommodation."

An early supporter of Ngo Dinh Diem, Mansfield altered his opinion on the Vietnam War after a visit to Vietnam in 1962. He reported to John F. Kennedy on December 2, 1962, that US money given to Diem's government was being squandered and that the US should avoid further involvement in Vietnam. He was thus the first American official to comment even mildly negatively on the war's condition.

On September 25, 1963, Mansfield introduced Kennedy during a joint appearance with him at the Yellowstone County Fairgrounds, Kennedy expressing his appreciation afterward and adding, "I know that those of you who live in Montana know something of his character and his high standard of public service, but I am not sure that you are completely aware of what a significant role he has played in the last 3 years in passing through the United States Senate measure after measure which strengthens this country at home and abroad."

Mansfield delivered a eulogy on November 24, 1963, as President Kennedy's casket lay in state in the Capitol rotunda, saying, "He gave that we might give of ourselves, that we might give to one another until there would be no room, no room at all, for the bigotry, the hatred, prejudice, and the arrogance which converged in that moment of horror to strike him down."

During the Johnson administration, Mansfield, convinced that it was a blunder based on just aims, became a skeptic of US involvement in the Vietnam War. In February 1965, he lobbied against escalating aerial bombardment of North Vietnam in the aftermath of Pleiku, arguing in a letter to the president that Operation Rolling Thunder would lead to a need for "vastly strengthened... American forces."

In 1964, Mansfield, as Senate Majority Leader, filed a procedural motion to have the Civil Rights Act of 1964 discussed by the whole Senate rather than by the Judiciary Committee, which had killed similar legislation seven years earlier. Mansfield voted in favor of the Civil Rights Acts of 1957, 1960, 1964, and 1968, as well as the 24th Amendment to the US Constitution and the Voting Rights Act of 1965, but did not vote on the confirmation of Thurgood Marshall to the US Supreme Court.

He hailed the new Richard Nixon administration, especially the "Nixon Doctrine" announced at Guam in 1969 that the US would honor all treaty commitments, provide a nuclear umbrella for its allies, and supply weapons and technical assistance to countries where warranted without committing American forces to local conflicts.

In turn, Nixon turned to Mansfield for advice and as his liaison with the Senate on Vietnam. Nixon began a steady withdrawal and replacement of US troops shortly after he took office in January 1969, a policy supported by Mansfield. During his first term, Nixon reduced American forces by 95%, leaving only 24,200 in late 1972; the last ones left in March 1973.

During the economic crisis of 1971, Mansfield was not afraid to reach across the aisle to help the economy:

What we're in is not a Republican recession or a Democratic recession; both parties had much to do with bringing us where we are today. But we're facing a national situation which calls for the best which all of us can produce, because we know the results will be something which we will regret.

Mansfield attended the November 17, 1976, meeting between President-elect Jimmy Carter and Democratic congressional leaders in which Carter sought out support for a proposal to have the president's power to reorganize the government reinstated with potential to be vetoed by Congress.

Mansfield Amendments
Two controversial amendments by Mansfield limiting military funding of research were passed by Congress.
The Mansfield Amendment of 1969, passed as part of the fiscal year 1970 Military Authorization Act (Public Law 91-121), prohibited military funding of research that lacked a direct or apparent relationship to specific military function. Through subsequent modification the Mansfield amendment moved the Department of Defense toward the support of more short-term applied research in universities." The amendment affected the military, such as research funding by the Office of Naval Research (ONR).
The Mansfield Amendment of 1973 expressly limited appropriations for defense research through the Advanced Research Projects Agency, which is largely independent of the military, to projects with direct military application.

An earlier Mansfield Amendment, offered in 1971, called for the number of US troops stationed in Europe to be halved. On May 19, 1971, however, the Senate defeated the resolution 61–36.

US ambassador to Japan

Mansfield retired from the Senate in 1976 and was appointed ambassador to Japan in April 1977 by Jimmy Carter, a role that he retained during the Reagan administration until 1988. While serving in Japan, Mansfield was highly respected and was particularly renowned for describing the US-Japan relationship as the "most important bilateral relationship in the world, bar none." Mansfield's successor in Japan, Michael Armacost, noted in his memoirs that for Mansfield, the phrase was a "mantra." While in office, Mansfield also fostered relations between his home state of Montana and Japan. The state capital of Helena is the sister city to Kumamoto, on the island of Kyushu.

Honors
The Maureen and Mike Mansfield Library at the University of Montana, Missoula, is named after him and his wife Maureen, as was his request when informed of the honor. The library also contains the Maureen and Mike Mansfield Center, which is dedicated to Asian studies, and, like the Maureen and Mike Mansfield Foundation, "advancing understanding and co-operation in US-Asia relations." The Mike Mansfield Federal Building and United States Courthouse in Missoula was renamed in his honor in 2002.

The Montana Democratic Party holds an annual Mansfield-Metcalf Dinner named partially in his honor.

In 1977, Mansfield received the US Senator John Heinz Award for Greatest Public Service by an Elected or Appointed Official, an award given out annually by Jefferson Awards.

In 1977, he was awarded the Laetare Medal by the University of Notre Dame, the oldest and most prestigious award for American Catholics.

On January 19, 1989, Mansfield and Secretary of State George P. Shultz were awarded the Presidential Medal of Freedom by President Ronald Reagan. In his speech, Reagan recognized Mansfield as someone who has "distinguished himself as a dedicated public servant and loyal American." In 1990, he was given both the United States Military Academy, Sylvanus Thayer Award and Japan's Order of the Rising Sun with Paulownia Flowers, Grand Cordon. This is Japan's highest honor for someone who is not a head of state.

In 1999, Missoula's daily newspaper, the Missoulian, chose Mansfield as The Most Influential Montanan of the 20th Century.

Death
Mansfield died at the age of 98 on October 5, 2001. He was survived by his daughter, Anne Fairclough Mansfield (1939–2013), and one granddaughter.

The burial plot of Pvt. and Mrs. Mansfield can be found in section 2, marker 49-69F of Arlington National Cemetery.

See also

 List of United States political appointments that crossed party lines
 Maureen and Mike Mansfield Foundation

Citations

General references

Print 

 online
 online

Web

External links

Arlington National Cemetery
 The Maureen and Mike Mansfield Foundation, US-Asia relations
 The Maureen and Mike Mansfield Center at the University of Montana
 
 
 Legislative Summary: Statement by Senator Mike Mansfield , John F. Kennedy Library, 1964
 Remarks at the Presentation Ceremony for the Presidential Medal of Freedom – January 19, 1989 
 Mike Mansfield Papers (University of Montana Archives)
 Mansfield's America Oral History Project (University of Montana Archives)
 Don Oberdorfer Interviews with Mike Mansfield Oral History Project (University of Montana Archives)
 
 

|-

|-

|-

|-

|-

|-

|-

|-

|-

|-

|-

|-

|-

|-

1903 births
2001 deaths
20th-century American politicians
Ambassadors of the United States to Japan
United States Navy personnel of World War I
American people of Irish descent
American Roman Catholics
Burials at Arlington National Cemetery
Democratic Party members of the United States House of Representatives from Montana
Democratic Party United States senators from Montana
Laetare Medal recipients
Military personnel from Montana
Montana State University alumni
People from Brooklyn
Politicians from Great Falls, Montana
Presidential Medal of Freedom recipients
Recipients of the Four Freedoms Award
Recipients of the Order of the Rising Sun with Paulownia Flowers
United States Marines
United States Navy sailors
University of Montana alumni
United States Army soldiers